The Rogers Picnic was a one-day, annual summer music festival held in Toronto, Ontario, Canada.  Two events took place, one in 2007 and again in 2008.

The inaugural Rogers Picnic, created by Rogers Wireless, was on July 29, 2007, and was held at the outdoor venue, Toronto's Historic Fort York. The line up featured Canadian and international musicians and meshed rock, punk, ska, reggae, hip-hop, and more. Performers included The New Pornographers, The Roots, Tegan and Sara, The Dears, Bad Brains, Apostle of Hustle, Little Brother, Bedouin Soundclash, and Team Canada DJs.

The second annual Rogers Picnic took place on July 20, 2008, at the same venue, Historic Fort York. The line-up included Tokyo Police Club, Cat Power, Dizzee Rascal, Vampire Weekend, Animal Collective, City and Colour, Born Ruffians, The Carps, and Chromeo.

References

Rock festivals in Canada
Music festivals in Toronto
Music festivals established in 2007
Indie rock festivals